Arnold III may refer to:

Arnold III, Count of Looz (d. 1221), Count of Looz and Count of Rieneck
Arnold III Hahót (died 1292), Hungarian nobleman
Arnold III, Count of Bentheim-Steinfurt-Tecklenburg-Limburg (1554–1606), German nobleman